Olney Township may refer to:

 Olney Township, Richland County, Illinois
 Olney Township, Nobles County, Minnesota

Township name disambiguation pages